Chautham Assembly constituency was an assembly constituency in Khagaria district in the Indian state of Bihar.

Overview
As a consequence of the orders of the Delimitation Commission of India, Chautham Assembly constituency ceased to exist in 2010.

It was part of Khagaria Lok Sabha constituency.

Election results

1977-2005
In the October 2005 Bihar Assembly elections, Panna Lal Singh ‘Patel’ of JD(U) won the Chautham assembly seat defeating his nearest rival Sunita Sharma of LJP. Contests in most years were multi cornered but only winners and runners are being mentioned. Sunita Sharma of LJP defeated Panna Lal Singh ‘Patel’ of JD(U) in February 2005. Panna Lal Singh ‘Patel’ of Samta Party defeated Vidya Sagar Nishad of RJD in 2000. Satyanarain Singh of CPI defeated Ghanshyam Singh of Congress in 1995 and Arun Keshari of Janata Dal in 1990. Kamleshwari Singh of  Congress defeated Satyanarain Singh of  CPI in 1985. Ghanshyam Singh of Congress (I) defeated Jagadambi Mandal of Janata Party (SC) in 1980. Jagadambi Mandal, Independent, defeated Ghanshyam Singh of Congress in 1977.

References

Former assembly constituencies of Bihar
Politics of Khagaria district